The District Council of Karoonda East Murray is a local government area in the Murray Mallee area of South Australia. The main council offices are in Karoonda.

The council area covers 4,415 square kilometres and had a population of approximately 1,100 at the 2016 Census. The annual average rainfall is 350 mm.

It is entirely in the state electorate of Chaffey and the federal Division of Barker.

History

The council was established in 1979 when the District Council of Karoonda (established 1922) and the District Council of East Murray (established 1923) amalgamated.

The township of Karoonda was established in 1913 when the mallee railway lines were put in place to open the area to grain growing, as previous pastoral runs had failed.

Geography

It includes the towns and localities of Bakara, Borrika, Copeville, Galga, Halidon, Karoonda, Marama, Mindarie, Perponda, Sandalwood, Wanbi and Wynarka, and parts of Bowhill, Mantung and Mercunda.

Councillors

The District Council of Karoonda East Murray has a directly-elected mayor.

Mayors and chairmen of Karoonda East Murray

 Allan Ernest Arbon (1979-1981) 
 Douglas James (Doug) Fullston (1981-1993) 
 Allan Ernest Arbon (1993-2000) 
 Kevin Burdett (2000-2018) 
 Caroline Phillips (2018–Present)

References

External links
Council website

Karoonda East Murray, District Council of